Francis J. Gavin is an American historian currently serving as the Giovanni Agnelli Distinguished Professor and Director of the Henry A. Kissinger Center for Global Affairs at Johns Hopkins University School of Advanced International Studies in Washington, D.C. He is also the chairman of the Board of Editors for the Texas National Security Review.

Career

Prior to his tenure at Johns Hopkins SAIS, Gavin was a Professor of Political Science at MIT, where he also served as the inaugural Frank Stanton Chair in Nuclear Security Policy Studies. Before joining MIT, he taught at the University of Texas from 2000 to 2013. While there, he was named the Tom Slick Professor of International Affairs at the Lyndon B. Johnson School of Public Affairs in 2005, and served as the Director of the Robert S. Strauss Center for International Security and Law. From 2005 until 2010, Gavin directed The American Assembly's multiyear, national initiative, The Next Generation Project: U.S. Global Policy and the Future of International Institutions.

Gavin is an Associate of the Managing the Atom Program at the Belfer Center for Science and International Affairs at Harvard University, Senior Fellow of the Clements Program in History, Strategy, and Statecraft, a Distinguished Scholar at the Robert S. Strauss Center for International Security and Law, a senior advisor to the Nuclear Proliferation International History Project at the Woodrow Wilson Center, and a life-member of the Council on Foreign Relations.

Education
Gavin received his PhD and MA in history from the University of Pennsylvania, a Master of Studies in Modern European History from Oxford and a BA in Political Science from the University of Chicago.

Bibliography

Books
 
Nuclear Statecraft: History and Strategy in America's Atomic Age (Cornell University Press, 2012)*Lyndon Johnson and the New Global Challenges of the 1960s (edited with Mark Lawrence, Oxford University Press, 2014)
Chaos in the Liberal World Order: The Trump Presidency and International Politics in the Twenty-First Century (edited with Robert Jervis, Joshua Rovner, and Diane Labrosse, Columbia University Press 2018)
Nuclear Weapons and American Grand Strategy (Brookings Institution Press, 2020)

Articles
“Power, Politics, and U.S. Policy in Iran, 1950-1953.” Journal of Cold War Studies, Winter 1999: 58-89
“The Legends of Bretton Woods,” Orbis, Spring 1996, pp. 183–199
“The Myth of Flexible Response:  American Strategy in Europe during the 1960s,” International History Review, December 2001:  847-875
“The Gold Battles within the Cold War:  American Monetary Policy and the Defense of Europe, 1960-1963,” Diplomatic History, Winter 2002:  61-94
“Blasts from the Past:  Nuclear Proliferation and Rogue States Before the Bush Doctrine,” International Security, Winter 2005, pp. 100–135
“History and Policy,” International Journal, Winter 2008
“Same as it ever was: Nuclear Alarmism, Proliferation, and the Cold War,” International Security, Winter 2010, pp. 7–37
 
“Politics, History and the Ivory Tower-Policy Gap in the Nuclear Proliferation Debate,” Journal of Strategic Studies, August 2012, pp. 573–600
“History, Security Studies, and the July Crisis,” Journal of Strategic Studies, Volume 37, Issue 2, 2014, pp. 319–331
“What If? The Historian and the Counterfactual,” Security Studies, Volume 24, Issue 3, 2015
“Strategies of Inhibition: U.S. Grand Strategy, the Nuclear Revolution, and Nonproliferation,” International Security vol. 40, No. 1, summer 2015, Pages 9–46
"Rethinking the Bomb: Nuclear Weapons and American Grand Strategy,” Texas National Security Review, vol. 2, no. 1, winter 2019

Critical studies and reviews of Gavin's work
Gold, dollars, and power

Nuclear statecraft

References

External links
Gavin's biography on the Johns Hopkins University website
Gavin's biography on the Strauss Center website

Living people
University of Pennsylvania alumni
University of Chicago alumni
Alumni of the University of Oxford
Harvard Kennedy School staff
University of Virginia faculty
University of Texas at Austin faculty
Columbia University faculty
21st-century American historians
American male non-fiction writers
1962 births
21st-century American male writers